Georgia Stomps, Atlanta Struts and Other Contemporary Dance Favorites is a live album by American fingerstyle guitarist and composer John Fahey, released in 1998. It was the second and last live album he recorded and released during his lifetime.

History
Georgia Stomps, Atlanta Struts and Other Contemporary Dance Favorites was recorded at the Horizon Theatre in Atlanta, Georgia in 1997. It was Fahey's first album playing solo electric guitar and was recorded at the release party for his earlier 1997 release Womblife. George Winston, whom Fahey had signed and first recorded on Takoma Records stated regarding Fahey's switch to electric, "He exhausted everything that he wanted to do with the acoustic guitar." Fahey himself had stated that it was also due to age and easier on his fingers to play.

In his article "Looking for Blind Joe Death" for The Village Voice, writer Andy Beta described Fahey's performances of the period as "Fahey eschewed the acoustic steel-string altogether; he didn't even own a guitar, pawning it to make his rent. Due to the effects of Epstein-Barr syndrome and diabetes, his immaculate style slowed. Gone were the ornate five-finger rolls of a one-man orchestra as instead he swamped his tone in delay and reverb, stirring up fuliginous, phantasmal lines that slowly accrued in the air."

Reception 

Music critic Brian Olewnick of Allmusic recommended the release, stating "...this performance, with its heavy blues basis and rich textural fabric, provides a direct confrontation with one of the most purely musical and idiosyncratic guitarists around." Tony Scherman of Entertainment Weekly called it, " typically sardonic: This is as far from dance music as you'll get... Fahey's doing what he's always done: painting highly personal soundscapes, using American roots music as his palette".

Track listing
 "The House of the Rising Sun/Nightmare" (Public Domain, Artie Shaw) – 19:09
 "Juana/Guitar Lamento" (Fahey, Bola Sete) – 17:06
 "Red Rocking Chair" (Public Domain) – 9:26
 "Song for Sara" (Fahey) – 6:20
 "Son House/Marilyn/My Prayer/Mood Indigo" (Public Domain, Fahey, Georges Boulanger, Jimmy Kennedy, Duke Ellington, Barney Bigard) – 21:05

Personnel
John Fahey – guitar
Production notes
Kristina Johnson– producer
Jeff Hunt– producer, cover design
Jon Philpot– engineer
David Daniell– engineer
Chris Griffin– mastering
Susan Archie – artwork
Bettina Herzner – photography

References

John Fahey (musician) live albums
1998 live albums